The 2003 Micronesian Championships in Athletics took place between April 25–26, 2003. The event was held in Koror, Palau.

A total of 29 events were contested, 14 by men, 14 by women and 1 mixed. In addition, there was a mixed non-championship hammer throwing competition for both men and women including Australian guest athletes.

Medal summary
Medal winners and their results were published on the Athletics Weekly webpage.

Men

†: non-championship event

Women

†: non-championship event

Mixed

Medal table (unofficial)

References

Micronesian Championships in Athletics
Athletics in Palau
Sports in Palau
Micronesian Championships
Micro
International sports competitions hosted by Palau
April 2003 sports events in Oceania